Toronto Southwest was an Ontario provincial electoral district in the old City of Toronto's west-end. It was represented in the Legislative Assembly of Ontario from 1914 until 1926, when it was abolished and redistributed into the Brockton, Dovercourt, Bracondale, Bellwoods, St. Andrew, and St. Patrick districts.  It had two seats in the Legislature: Seat A and Seat B.

Boundaries
Toronto Southwest's boundaries remained the same for the three elections that it was contested; and gaining a significant boost in eligible voters in 1919, when women and underage soldiers were given the right to vote for the first time. The northern boundary was College Street, starting at Lansdowne Avenue, across. It then went southwards along its eastern border on the western edge of University Avenue to Simcoe Street and then to Lake Ontario. It also included the Toronto Islands. The western border picked up on land on Dunn Avenue and then jogged west on the north side of Queen Street West to the east side of Lansdowne Avenue. It continued north on Lansdowne to the south side of College Street.

Members of Provincial Parliament

Election results
Elections were run as separate races for Seat A and Seat B rather than a combined race.

Seat A

Seat B

References

Notes

Citations

Former provincial electoral districts of Ontario
Provincial electoral districts of Toronto